Jicun is a town of Yuanshi County in southwestern Hebei province, China, located  northwest of the county seat. , it has 14 villages under its administration.

See also
List of township-level divisions of Hebei

References

Township-level divisions of Hebei